"The Message" is the first official release by Gibraltarian Flamenco Metal band Breed 77. It was recorded at Ripley Studios for Household Name Records.

It was released as a 3-Track EP and a limited amount of these were produced and this is now one of the hardest Breed 77 releases to get hold of.

All tracks written by Danny Felice & Paul Isola.

The line-up for this EP consisted of: Paul Isola, Danny Felice, Stuart Cavilla and Pete Chichone.

Track listing

 "The Message"
 "Downer"
 "A Choice Has Got To Be Made"

References

1998 debut EPs